Global public policy networks (GPPNs) are what may be considered a new actor in the stage of world affairs. A non-state entity in that they are not states, and not necessarily incorporated in the legal sense, they may take on an international role, even without the formal status of an international or multilateral organization/institution. These networks are comprised by various actors from civil society, governments, government agencies, industry, industry groups, and perhaps multilateral organizations/institutions.  Their activities cover the range of steps in the policy process, beyond to policy proposals or lobbying, including agenda setting, policy formulation, negotiation, rule making, coordination, implementation, and evaluation.  Their expertise can often play an important role in global debates and norm establishment.

The basis for scholarship on GPPNs can be seen to be set by Robert Keohane and Joseph Nye, as well as Anne-Marie Slaughter in the United States.  While their status and role in the development of norms in the transnational sphere can be understood through work on  "hard" and "soft" law including Kenneth W. Abbott, and Jon Birger Skjærseth. Further scholarship on their role in global governance includes work by Diane Stone.

Example
Examples of GPPNs include:  The World Commission on Dams, the International Competition Network, the Global Water Partnership, the Medicines for Malaria Venture (which has since become a foundation), the Internet & Jurisdiction Policy Network, and REN21.

See also
 Issue network
 Policy network (in German)

References

Dobner, Petra. "On the Constitutionability of Global Public Policy Networks". Indiana Journal of Global Legal Studies, Volume 16, Issue 2, Summer 2009, pp. 605–619
Brenner, Thorsten et al. "Global Public Policy: Chancen und Herausforderungen des vernetzten Regierens, 48 Zeitschrift für Politik 361, 364-66 (2001)
Stone, Diane. "Global Public Policy, Transnational Policy Communities and Their Networks," Policy Studies Journal, 2008: 36 (10): 19-38.

External links
 On the Constitutionability of Global Public Policy Networks, Petra Dobner
 Global Public Policy Networks: Lessons Learned and Challenges Ahead Witte, Jan Martin 

Think tanks
Public policy
Advocacy groups